Morten Johannes Lauridsen (born February 27, 1943) is an American composer. A National Medal of Arts recipient (2007), he was composer-in-residence of the Los Angeles Master Chorale from 1994 to 2001, and is the Distinguished Professor Emeritus of Composition at the University of Southern California Thornton School of Music, where he taught for 52 years until his retirement in 2019.

About 
A native of the Pacific Northwest, Lauridsen worked as a Forest Service firefighter and lookout (on an isolated tower near Mount St. Helens), where he remained on this tower alone for 10 weeks. Lauridsen stated that it was a great time of self-reflection for him, and that it helped him realize that music needed to become a central part of his life. He attended Whitman College for 2 years, before traveling south to study composition at the University of Southern California with Ingolf Dahl, Halsey Stevens, Robert Linn, and Harold Owen. He began teaching at USC in 1967 and has been on their faculty ever since.

In 2006, Lauridsen was named an "American Choral Master" by the National Endowment for the Arts. In 2007 he received the National Medal of Arts from the President in a White House ceremony, "for his composition of radiant choral works combining musical beauty, power and spiritual depth that have thrilled audiences worldwide".

His works have been recorded on more than 200 CDs, five of which have received Grammy Award nominations, including O Magnum Mysterium by the Tiffany Consort, A Company of Voices by Conspirare, Sound The Bells by The Bay Brass, and two all-Lauridsen discs entitled Lux Aeterna by the Los Angeles Master Chorale led by Paul Salamunovich, and Nocturnes with the Polyphony choir and the Britten Sinfonia conducted by Stephen Layton. His principal publishers are Peermusic (New York/Hamburg) and Faber Music (London).

A recipient of numerous grants, prizes, and commissions, Lauridsen chaired the Composition department at the USC Thornton School of Music from 1990 to 2002 and founded the School's Advanced Studies program in Film Scoring. He has held residencies as guest composer/lecturer at over 100 universities and has received honorary doctorates from Oklahoma State University, Westminster Choir College, King's College, University of Aberdeen, Scotland, and Whitman College. In 2014 he was invited to be Honorary Artistic President of Interkultur/World Choir Games. In 2016 he was awarded the ASCAP Foundation Life in Music Award. In late February 2020, via an update on his Facebook page, Lauridsen revealed he had retired from the Thornton School of Music in the spring of 2019, after having taught classes there for over 50 years. He will still travel to university residencies and concerts worldwide.

Lauridsen now divides his time between Los Angeles and his home in the San Juan Archipelago off the northern coast of Washington State.

Compositions

His eight vocal cycles and two collections—Les Chansons des Roses (Rilke), Mid-Winter Songs (Graves), A Winter Come (Moss), Madrigali: Six "FireSongs" on Italian Renaissance Poems, Nocturnes (Rilke, Neruda and Agee), Cuatro Canciones (Lorca), Four Madrigals on Renaissance Texts, A Backyard Universe, Five Songs on American Poems (Moss, Witt, Gioia and Agee) and Lux Aeterna—his series of sacred a cappella motets (O magnum mysterium, Ave Maria, O Nata Lux, Ubi caritas et amor, and Ave Dulcissima Maria) and numerous instrumental works are featured regularly in concert by distinguished artists and ensembles throughout the world. O Magnum Mysterium, Dirait-on (from Les Chansons des Roses), O Nata Lux (from Lux Aeterna) and Sure On This Shining Night (from Nocturnes) have become the all-time best-selling choral octavos distributed by Theodore Presser, in business since 1783.

His musical approaches are very diverse, ranging from direct to abstract in response to various characteristics (subject matter, language, style, structure, historical era, etc.) of the texts he sets. His Latin sacred settings, such as the Lux Aeterna and motets, often reference Gregorian chant plus Medieval and Renaissance procedures while blending them within a freshly contemporary sound while other works such as the Madrigali and Cuatro Canciones are highly chromatic or atonal. His music has an overall lyricism and is tightly constructed around melodic and harmonic motifs.

Referring to Lauridsen's sacred music, the musicologist and conductor Nick Strimple said he was "the only American composer in history who can be called a mystic, (whose) probing, serene work contains an elusive and indefinable ingredient which leaves the impression that all the questions have been answered ... From 1993 Lauridsen's music rapidly increased in international popularity, and by century's end he had eclipsed Randall Thompson as the most frequently performed American choral composer."

Vocal works

{| class="wikitable"
|-
! Date !! Composition/Song Cycle !! Movements
|-
| 2012 ||Prayer (On a Poem by Dana Gioia) || 
|-
| 2008 ||Canticle/O Vos Omnes|| 
|-
| 2006 ||Chanson Eloignee (Rilke) || 
|-
| 2005 ||Nocturnes (written for the American Choral Directors Association's Brock Commission) ||I. Sa Nuit d'Été (Rainer Maria Rilke)
II. Soneto de la Noche (Pablo Neruda)

III. Sure on this Shining Night (James Agee)

IV. Epilogue: Voici le soir (Rilke, added in 2008)
|-
| 2004 ||Ave Dulcissima Maria (written for the Harvard Glee Club) || 
|-
| 1999 ||Ubi Caritas et Amor||
|-
| 1997 || Lux Aeterna (Morten Lauridsen composition) |Lux Aeterna||I. IntroitusII. In Te, Domine, SperaviIII. O Nata LuxIV. Veni, Sancte SpiritusV. Agnus Dei|-
| 1997 ||Ave Maria|| 
|-
| 1994 ||O Magnum Mysterium||
|-
| 1993 ||Les Chansons des Roses (settings of poems by Rainer Maria Rilke) ||I. En Une Seule FleurII. Contre Qui, RoseIII. De Ton Rêve Trop PleinIV. La Rose ComplèteV. Dirait-on|-
| 1987 ||Madrigali: Six "Firesongs" on Italian Renaissance Poems||I. Ov'è, Lass', Il Bel Viso?II. Quando Son Piu LontanIII. Amor, Io Sento L'almaIV. Io PiangoV. Luci Serene e ChiareVI. Se Per Havervi, Oime|-
| 1981 ||Cuatro Canciones Sobre Poesias de Federico García Lorca||
|-
| 1980 ||Mid-Winter Songs (on poems by Robert Graves) ||I. Lament for PasiphaëII. Like SnowIII. She Tells Her Love While Half AsleepIV. Mid-Winter WakingV. Intercession in Late October|-
| 1976 ||Where Have the Actors Gone||
|-
| 1970 ||I Will Lift Up Mine Eyes||
|-
| 1970 ||O Come, Let Us Sing Unto the Lord||
|-
| 1967 ||A Winter Come (on poems by Howard Moss) ||I. When Frost Moves FastII. As Birds Come NearerIII. The Racing WaterfallIV. A Child Lay DownV. Who Reads By StarlightVI. And What Of Love|-
| 1965 ||A Backyard Universe||

|}

Recordings

Over 200 recordings of works by Morten Lauridsen have been released, including five that have received Grammy nominations.

Nine All-Lauridsen CDs:

Sheet music sales and performances

Morten Lauridsen is currently one of America's most performed composers, with hundreds of performances each year throughout the world in venues including Carnegie Hall, Lincoln Center, Kennedy Center, Walt Disney Concert Hall, the Vatican, Sydney Opera House and Westminster Abbey. Over one million copies of his scores have been sold and his Dirait-on, O Magnum Mysterium and O Nata Lux have become the all-time best selling octavos distributed by the Theodore Presser Co., in business since 1783.

Recordings of Morten Lauridsen's compositions are featured regularly on radio broadcasts throughout the United States, and he is a frequent interview guest on radio and television programs, including a recent KCET Life and Times program, the oft-repeated national broadcast of "A Portrait of Morten Lauridsen" on First Art, and a nationally broadcast Christmas Day feature on NPR's Weekend Edition with Scott Simon. He has been profiled in several extended printed articles, including those in the Los Angeles Times "Calendar", Seattle Times, Choral Journal, Choir and Organ, Chorus America's Voice, Fanfare Magazine, and the Wall Street Journal. He has received over four hundred commission requests, most recently from Harvard University, the American Choral Director's Association and the Pacific Chorale, and is a frequent guest lecturer and Artist/Composer-in-Residence.

His principal publishers are Peermusic (New York/Hamburg) and Peer's affiliate, Faber Music (London).

Teaching life

In addition to these positions, Lauridsen has served as Artistic Advisor on the Boards of the Los Angeles Master Chorale, Dale Warland Singers, I Cantori (New York), USC Scoring for Films/TV Program, National Children's Chorus, Creative Kids Education Foundation, Volti (San Francisco Chamber Singers), New York City Master Chorale, Jacaranda, and Angeles Chorale.

Publications
"It's a Still Life That Runs Deep: The Influence of Zurbaran's Still Life With Lemons, Oranges and a Rose on Morten Lauridsen's Composition O Magnum Mysterium", Wall Street Journal, February 21, 2009

foreword to the book, Evoking Sound, by James Jordan, GIA Publications, 2009

"Morten Lauridsen on Composing Choral Music," a chapter in the book Contemporary Choral Music Composers, GIA Publications, 2007

Liner notes for the CD Randall Thompson—The Peaceable Kingdom, Schola Cantorum of Oxford, Hyperion Records

"Remembering Halsey Stevens," National Association of Composer Journal, 1990

Documentary

The 2012 documentary film Shining Night: A Portrait of Composer Morten Lauridsen portrays the composer at his Waldron Island retreat and in rehearsals in California and Scotland. Commentaries about the composer by poet Dana Gioia, conductor Paul Salamunovich, composer/conductor Paul Mealor, composer Alex Shapiro and conductor Robert Geary, along with performances by the San Francisco Choral Society, University of Aberdeen Choral Society and Orchestra, Con Anima Chamber Choir and Volti, are featured. Works include O Magnum Mysterium, Lux Aeterna, Madrigali, Dirait-on, and Nocturnes'', with soundtracks by Polyphony and the Britten Sinfonia (conducted by Stephen Layton), The Singers: Minnesota Choral Artists (conducted by Matthew Culloton), and the Dale Warland Singers (conducted by Dale Warland).

References

External links
mortenlauridsen.net Composer's Website
Peermusic Classical: Morten Lauridsen Composer's Publisher and Bio
 Los Angeles Master Chorale bio
Morten Lauridsen interview by Bruce Duffie
A Choral Master's Grass-Roots Appeal, Wall Street Journal Review by Bruce Campbell
 The Best Composer You've Never Heard Of Wall Street Journal Review by Terry Teachout
 Song Without Borders Film, Shining Night: A Portrait of Composer Morten Lauridsen Film publisher's website
 Fanfare Magazine Review, Prayer: The Songs of Morten Lauridsen Transcribed on Composer's website

1943 births
Living people
20th-century classical composers
20th-century American composers
20th-century American male musicians
21st-century classical composers
21st-century American composers
21st-century American male musicians
American classical composers
American male classical composers
American people of Danish descent
Choral composers
Singers from Washington (state)
People from Colfax, Washington
People from Beaverton, Oregon
People from San Juan County, Washington
USC Thornton School of Music alumni
USC Thornton School of Music faculty
United States National Medal of Arts recipients